Education Partnerships Africa is a volunteer-run charity which sends UK university students to work in rural secondary schools in East Africa. It aims to benefit students in East Africa by improving education in its partner schools, and to give personal development opportunities to UK university students. It was established in Kisii in 1990 as The Kenya Project. Since then it has expanded to two further sites: Kakamega in Kenya and Mbarara in Uganda, and now works with around 30 schools each summer.

Summer project

Student volunteers, known as Project Workers, spend ten weeks during their summer vacation living, either in a pair or trio, in a rural community in Kenya or Uganda. They work in partnership with the school management and local community to identify the most important needs for the school, and how they can best be addressed. These might include investing in sustainable resources, such as library books, science equipment and small infrastructure projects, helping with school management issues, and setting up co-curricular activities. Schools typically receive a minimum of two years of investment from the charity, before being reassessed to establish whether they would benefit from further investment. Volunteers fundraise money in the UK before their visit to cover the costs of the project, which includes the school investment, as well as their own flights, accommodation and living costs.

Schools

In Kenya EPAfrica works primarily with government funded District Schools. These are schools which any students with acceptable grades can attend, and which do not charge fees for tuition. In Uganda the charity also works with Technical schools which provide more vocational studies. The schools tend to be of medium size, in very rural locations, and to be short of resources, but with the potential to improve. Any school meeting the basic criteria can apply and most will receive a visit during the summer to assess their eligibility. In total EPAfrica has worked with over 100 schools in East Africa, investing more than £200,000.

UK operations

Education Partnerships Africa is a registered charity in the UK. It is run and managed entirely by volunteers, the majority of whom are alumni (i.e. former Project Workers). Each university has its own University Committee, which is responsible for recruiting Project Workers and running training for them throughout the year.

The central charity is made up of a number of workstreams, such as Communications, IT and Finance, each headed up by a Workstream Lead. These are overseen by a Management Committee, made up of six volunteers. The strategic direction and governance of the organisation is overseen by a Board of Trustees, all of whom are also volunteers.

According to the Charity Commission the charity has an annual turnover of over £100,000, the majority of which is fundraised by its Project Workers. Because it is run entirely by volunteers the vast majority of this annual turnover is spent directly on its East Africa operations.

History

The charity began life in 1990 as The Kisii Project. In the early 1990s a group of Cambridge University students began teaching in a school in the Kisii area of Western Kenya. By 1995, Kisii Project had been incorporated into Link Africa (now Link Community Development) and extended to another two schools in the region. A few years later, the focus of the project was switched to resource investment to ensure sustainability.

In 2002 the project expanded to Oxford University and started sending 20 Project Workers a year to work in 10 schools in Kisii. The two university projects combined as a registered charity under the name The Kenya Project, which was later changed to Kenya Education Partnerships. From 2009 the charity began a period of expansion of its UK operations to a number of London universities, starting by recruiting Project Workers from University College London; the project went on to accept applications from all universities in London.

In 2008, violence following the disputed 2007 elections in Kenya made it unsafe for volunteers to be sent to Kenya so the charity moved its operations to Uganda for one summer. In 2010 it expanded to working in Kakamega, also in Western Kenya, and in 2013 it permanently expanded its operations to Mbarara in Uganda.

References

External links
EPAfrica official website

Educational charities based in the United Kingdom
Foreign charities operating in Kenya
Foreign charities operating in Uganda